Benjamin "Benjie" Bañez Magalong (born December 15, 1960) is a Filipino politician and retired police officer serving as the mayor of Baguio since 2019. Before entering politics, he served in the Philippine Constabulary and Philippine National Police (PNP) for 38 years. He was the chief of the Cordillera regional police office, the Criminal Investigation and Detection Group (CIDG), and the Directorate for Investigation and Detective Management (DIDM). He retired with the rank of Police Deputy Director General as the PNP's Deputy Chief for Operations.

Born and raised in Baguio, Magalong graduated from the Philippine Military Academy in 1982. He first served in Abra and Agusan del Norte before joining the Special Action Force (SAF) and heading its Special Operations Battalion from 1997 to 2001. He was accused of plotting to assassinate President Gloria Macapagal Arroyo in 2001 but was later cleared in 2005. He then led the quelling of the March 2005 prison riot in Camp Bagong Diwa. In 2006, he was detained for three months after joining an alleged failed coup attempt against Arroyo. After his reinstatement, he was assigned to the Philippine Drug Enforcement Agency (PDEA) and the Quezon City police office. He then became the director of the CIDG and chairman of the PNP Board of Inquiry on the Mamasapano Incident. Magalong published the investigation report on March 13, 2015, which implicated PNP chief Alan Purisima and President Benigno Aquino III of misconduct leading to the deaths of 44 SAF troopers.

In 2019, Magalong testified before the Senate accusing PNP chief Oscar Albayalde of protecting police officers involved in the drug trade.

He served as the contact tracing czar of the Philippine government's response to the COVID-19 pandemic from July 2020 until his irrevocable resignation on January 29, 2021.

Early life and education 
Benjie Magalong was born in Baguio on December 15, 1960, to Severiano Magalong Sr. (1929-2021) and  Fortunata Bañez of San Carlos, Pangasinan.

He spent his elementary days at Saint Louis University Laboratory Elementary School. He finished high school at what was then-Saint Louis Boys' High School (now Saint Louis University Laboratory High School).

He entered Saint Louis University for one-year, before entering the Philippine Military Academy, where he graduated as Magna cum laude in 1982's Sandigan class.

During his career, he graduated from the FBI National Academy. He also completed the Counter Terrorists Operation Course in Louisiana, USA, and the Senior Crisis Management Course in Washington, DC.

Police career

Philippine Constabulary 
Upon graduating in 1982, he joined the Philippine Constabulary and was assigned to its 62nd Battalion in Abra. During his stay there he was later promoted to the rank of captain. He would later on be assigned to Agusan del Norte.

1986 People Power Revolution in Baguio 

Magalong, who was then a lieutenant in command of the Philippine Constabulary detachment in Buguias, Benguet, played a key part in 1986 People Power Revolution in the Cordillera, as the first officer to defect from the administration of Ferdinand Marcos.  He left a skeletal force in command of their post in Northern Benguet and left for Baguio on the evening of February 23, going to the Baguio City Police station where he disarmed the station personnel to prevent any untoward incident. They were then welcomed upon proceeding to the Baguio Cathederal, where Baguio residents had gathered to protest the abuses of the Marcos administration - their own contribution to the largely peaceful People Power revolution.

Philippine National Police 
During the early days of the merger of the Philippine Constabulary and the Integrated National Police, Magalong would get to experience the CIDG for the first time. He later on described it as "not his world". He was transferred to the Special Action Force of the PNP of SAF, founded in 1983 by then Gen. (later President) Fidel V. Ramos of the PC. From 1997 to 2001, he headed its Special Operations Battalion, which is PNP's counterterrorism group.

2001 EDSA Revolution 
Vice President Gloria Macapagal Arroyo ascended to the presidency after President Joseph Estrada was removed from power in the Second EDSA Revolution. Magalong was later accused of plotting to assassinate the new president. Magalong described it as "a false charge; my name was used by some parties who wished to ingratiate themselves with the new administration." While he was under investigation, he was assigned to hazardous areas, to the Cordilleras in 2001 and back to Mindanao in 2003. It was only in March 2005 that he was absolved of the charges against him.

2005 Bicutan Siege 
On March 14, 2005, two weeks after Magalong was absolved of the assassination plot charges against him, inmates in the Camp Bagong Diwa were able to seize weapons from the guards. Magalong would lead the assault on the Camp, with 64 other SAF troopers. It resulted in 27 dead inmates and the surviving inmates pleaded a massacre and human rights violation on the part of the SAF. It was during this siege that Magalong almost died, evidenced by his kevlar helmet with two bullets embedded in it. He keeps it in his office as a reminder, saying "I keep it around, just to remind myself, tama na yung pa-warrior-warrior mo, Benjie, you have a family now."

2006 State of Emergency 
On February 24, 2006, President Gloria Macapagal Arroyo issued Proclamation 1017, declaring a state of emergency existed in the country. Malacañang justified this as they claimed to have foiled a coup d'état attempt, involving several members of the Armed Forces of the Philippines and the Philippine National Police. Among those alleged perpetrators was Supt. Benjamin Magalong, alleged to have been participating in the destabilization efforts and attempting to recruit men to beef up the main destabilization force. He later on admitted his role in the plot and was imprisoned for three months.

Police Regional Office Cordillera (PRO-COR) 
Magalong was appointed as head of the Regional Office of the PNP in Cordillera or PRO-COR on October 29, 2011, succeeding C/Supt. Villamor Bumanglag. Under his administration, several advances were made, such as a purchase of ammo reloading machines, which cut the costs for reloading slug and a GIS-based crime mapping system was launched, which tracks hazard-prone areas and recent crime data in the region. Abra and Kalinga also experienced its most peaceful elections in 2013. He was succeeded by C/Supt. Isagani Nerez

Criminal Investigation and Detection Group (CIDG) 
In December 2013, he returned for the second time to the CIDG and this was appointed as its new chief, succeeding Dir. Francisco Uyami Jr. The CIDG is the PNP's primary investigation arm.  Magalong was originally intended to head the Directorate for Intelligence (DI), but was instead appointed to the CIDG. He said in an interview for the Asian Dragon Magazine that he did not want the post due to its highly politicized nature and that he even tried to exchange commands with Gen. Calima who was appointed in his stead as DI Chief, but Gen. Calima did not want anything to do with the post. He assumed the post and afterwards created a 14-man National Advisory Council, with the goal of the PNP transformation program known as "Patrolman 2030".

2015 Mamasapano crisis 

Gen. Magalong led the Board of Inquiry (BOI) on the Mamasapano incident. Pressure came from various groups telling him to either soften the president's liability or to not release the report at all. On March 13, 2015, the BOI released their report on the incident. It indicted President Benigno Aquino III, Gen. Alan Purisima, and SAF Chief Getulio Napeñas as liable for the deaths of the 44 SAF troopers for bypassing the chain of command.

Post-Mamasapano inquiry 
After the report had been released, he was transferred to the PNP Directorate for Investigation and Detective Management in July 2015 by the new PNP Chief Ricardo Marquez, his classmate in the 1982 Sandigan Class, succeeding Dir. Francisco  Montenegro.

In 2016, incoming PNP Chief Ronald "Bato" Dela Rosa said that he will appoint Magalong as his Deputy Chief of Operations.

Retirement from the PNP 
After reaching the mandatory retirement age of 56, Gen. Magalong retired on December 15, 2016, from the Philippine National Police, as the Deputy Chief of Operations, having served for more than 38 years. He received 166 military and PNP achievement and merit medals for his combat and law enforcement accomplishments, among which, are the Distinguished Conduct Star, the Distinguished Service Star, the PNP Gold Cross and 15 Outstanding Achievement Medals. He was succeeded by PDDG. Ramon Apolinario.

Post-retirement 
Since his retirement, Magalong has served as Senior Vice president for Operations of Steel Asia, one of the largest steel manufacturers in Asia until November 1, 2018. On January 5, 2018 President Duterte appointed him to serve as a director of the Philippine National Oil Company or PNOC, to serve the unexpired term of Bruce Concepcion until June 30, 2018.

Political career

Mayor of Baguio

2019 election 
On October 17, 2018, Magalong filled his certificate of candidacy for the mayoralty post of Baguio. He ran under a platform of speedy government action, revitalizing the environment, innovating peace and order condition, aggressive traffic management, empowering the youth and a responsive education program. He would go against 8 others, mostly veteran politicians including Vice Mayor Edison Bilog, councilors Ed Avila and Leandro Yangot, Jr. and former councilor Jose Molintas.

On the night of May 13, 2019, election day, he was declared as the winner of the 2019 mayoral polls garnering 41,482 votes, a large margin over his closest contender, Vice Mayor Bilog, who garnered 22,670 votes. He was proclaimed along with re-elected Congressman Mark O. Go and Vice Mayor-elect Faustino A. Olowan. He succeeded outgoing three-term Mayor Mauricio G. Domogan, who lost in his congressional comeback bid.

A month after his proclamation as the winner in the mayoral elections, Magalong warned establishments in the city of the existence of several persons using his name to supposedly extort money or place food orders, mostly in restaurants he and his family frequents.

Mayoralty

2019 
During his inauguration on June 30, 2019, Magalong outlined his 10-point agenda for the city of Baguio for the next three years. The list included:

 Speeding Up Government Action
 Revitalizing The Environment
 Innovating Peace and Order Condition
 Aggressive Traffic Management
 Responsive Education Program
 Empowering the Youth
 Expanding Health and Social Services
 Responsible Tourism
 Enlivened Culture, Arts, Crafts, and Heritage
 Market Modernization

Faced with the city's massive waste problem, he began office by temporarily halting the collection of biodegradable waste due to the malfunction of the city's waste-to-fertilizer machines. According to him, a possible solution to would be waste-to-energy technology, which will be initially tested by PNOC. He also ordered Baguio's dumpsite in Irisan be converted into an ecopark by 2020.

Several establishment were closed due to lacking or erroneous permits. Massive cleanup drives of the city began since he took office. In accordance with President Duterte's order to clear public roads, several obstructions in the city's roads such as construction and advertising materials were ordered immediately removed.

He further expanded his 10-point agenda to 15 points, adding the following to his agenda:

 Efficient Disaster Management
 Empowered and Accountable Barangay Governance
 Strengthened Livelihood and Entrepreneurial Services
 Unemployment Reduction
 Resolution of IP clans and claims

In a move to revitalize the air quality in the city's main thoroughfare, the ascending lane (right side) of Session Road will be closed to traffic every Sunday beginning August 4 for 4 weeks thereafter. However, due to concerns aired, the implementation was postponed to August 18. The closure was extended for up to 6 months every Sunday, beginning August 18, 2019.

In September 2019, he expressed his dismay over the ongoing rehabilitation of the Baguio Convention Center, and has since then vowed that he will not tolerate substandard work adding it was about time these contractors became answerable to the people.

He also testified before a Senate hearing on "ninja cops", accusing then-PNP General Oscar Albayalde of blocking the dismissal of 13 policemen involved in an irregular drug raid in 2013, from which some policemen had allegedly profited from. In October 2019, days after his testimony at the Senate, Magalong revealed that he has been receiving death threats and is worried for his family.

In November 2019, Magalong stood behind one of the city's POSD officer for performing his task without fear or favor. Judge Nelson Largo of Cabanatuan City parked his car in a no parking area, causing the officer to issue him a parking ticket and have the license plate of the car removed, to which Largo retaliated by issuing a subpoena, calling the act of removing the license plates as a violation of due process. Magalong called Judge Largo's actions of having the enforcers subpoenaed as unprofessional and arrogant and said he himself was prepared to accompany the enforcers involved. Days later, during a probe launched by the Supreme Court, Largo retracted the subpoena. The Baguio City Council has since then declared Largo as persona non grata via a Resolution.

2020 
In December 2019, amidst the influx of tourist into the city, Magalong ordered an aggressive anti-littering campaign, leading to the arrest of 49 people as of January 2020 and has promised that he will continue such campaign.

In January 2020, Magalong, along with DILG Secretary Eduardo Año and DOT Secretary Bernadette Romulo-Puyat officially launched the rehabilitation of the city, which they estimate may last more than three years. The city, however, will not be closed to the public, unlike the rehabilitation efforts done in Boracay.

During a top level meeting on the problems hounding the city, specifically on its air quality, solid waste management and water pollution and supply, Magalong said in jest that the water used to grow the famous strawberries come from the cesspool of Baguio, which is illegally discharged into the Balili River. The statement caused disdain to La Trinidad and Benguet officials. La Trinidad Mayor Romeo Salda disproved Magalong's statement, saying that no irrigation comes from the Balili River as they only source it from the creek of Pico and Puguis. Magalong later issued a statement of apology, saying, "I came up with uncalled for statement that I should have not said at all. I was wrong and I apologize," emphasizing that he was pertaining to the issue of the city's guilt of polluting the river which flows into the municipality of La Trinidad.

In late January, due to the threat posed by the COVID-19 pandemic, Magalong canceled the opening parade of the Panagbenga Festival and other major events within the next three weeks, also affecting the CARAA Games. In an interview, Magalong stated that "the tourism revenues are the least of my concerns. My main priorities are the health of my constituents," which earned him praise from all sectors, especially from the residents of Baguio. The Panagbenga Festival was later rescheduled to late March 21–29, a month from the original scheduled date, but was scrapped altogether due to the ensuing COVID-19 lockdown.

COVID-19 National Chief Tracing Czar 

On July 13, Magalong was appointed by the national government as the chief of contact tracing efforts (Contact Tracing Czar) of the Philippine government's response to the COVID-19 pandemic, overseeing and recommending contact tracing efforts on a national basis. Magalong's COVID-19 testing and tracing policies in Baguio were hailed by medical experts as a model that the whole country should follow.

Six months later, he and his wife Arlene were seen together with other celebrities and high society personalities in a "super-spreader" birthday party hosted by socialite and eventologist Tim Yap at The Manor at Camp John Hay on January 17, 2021. Despite the prevalent lockdown, evident quarantine violations were observed, among others nil social distancing and guests not wearing face masks. Magalong acknowledged the lapses and his presence in that event, and on January 29, he announced his immediate resignation as the country's contact tracing czar. Despite the Duterte administration rejecting it, he insisted that the resignation is irrevocable, but will still help the task force in its COVID-19 response efforts.

2022 election 
On October 5, 2021, Magalong filed his COC for re-election for a second term. He faced off against former Mayor Mauricio Domogan, former Vice Mayor Edison Bilog and perennial candidate Jeffrey Pinnic. As of 3:18 PM of May 13, when 100% of the votes were already canvassed, Magalong garnered 70,342 votes, Narrowly beating former Mayor Mauricio Domogan by a small margin of 17,144 votes, both Domogan and Bilog would concede a day after the election. Magalong would then continue to serve as Mayor of Baguio with his second term starting on June 30, 2022.

Awards and honors

Decorations 
Among his decorations include:

  Medalya ng Kabayanihan (PNP Distinguished Conduct Medal)
  Medalya ng Katapatan sa Paglilingkod (PNP Distinguished Service Medal)
  Medalya ng Katangitanging Gawa (PNP Outstanding Achievement Medal)
  Medalya ng Kagitingan (PNP Medal of Valor)
  Medalya ng Katapangan (PNP Bravery Medal)
  Medalya ng Pambihirang Paglilingkod (PNP Special Service Medal)
  Medalya ng Paglilingkod (PNP Service Medal)
  Medalya ng Kasanayan (PNP Efficiency Medal)
  Medalya ng Paglilingkod sa Luzon (PNP Luzon Campaign Medal)
  Medalya ng Pagtulong sa Nasalanta (PNP Disaster Relief and Rehabilitation Operations Campaign Medal)
  Medalya ng Papuri (PNP Commendation Medal)
  Medalya ng Mabuting Asal (PNP Good Conduct Medal)
  Medalya ng Paglaban sa Manliligalig (PNP Anti-dissidence Campaign Medal)
   Bronze Cross Medal
  Military Merit Medal
  Wounded Personnel Medal
  Silver Wing Medal
  Military Commendation Medal
  Military Civic Action Medal

Presidential Lingkod Bayan Award 
In 2013, Magalong was conferred the Presidential Lingkod Bayan award for his peacekeeping initiatives in Kalinga and Abra; GIS-based crime mapping system; PNP 2030 patrol initiatives; human resource development program; and environment advocacy, among others.

Outstanding Citizen of Baguio 
During the celebration of the city's founding anniversary on September 1, 2017, Gen. Magalong was awarded as an outstanding citizen of Baguio, along with Dr. Joanne Jularbal Balderas and Dr. Dionisio R. Claridad Jr.

References

Living people
21st-century Filipino politicians
Filipino police officers
Mayors of Baguio
1960 births
Philippine Military Academy alumni
Saint Louis University (Philippines) alumni
Heads of government-owned and controlled corporations of the Philippines
Duterte administration personnel
Benigno Aquino III administration personnel
Recipients of the Bronze Cross Medal
Recipients of the Military Merit Medal (Philippines)
Recipients of the Silver Wing Medal
Recipients of the Military Commendation Medal
Recipients of the Military Civic Action Medal